Manouba Governorate is one of the twenty-four governorates (provinces) of Tunisia and is in inland, northern Tunisia. It has a population of 379,518 (as at the 2014 census), and an area of 1,137 km2. The capital is Manouba.

Geography 
The east and west of the province have high foothills; from both ranges the three lakes of Tunis and the Bay of Tunis can be seen. The east part of the west range is named the Forest of Tebourba, one of its four largest settlements.

The average temperature is 18.7 °C and annual rainfall is 450 millimeters.

Administrative divisions
Administratively, the governorate is divided into eight delegations (mutamadiyat), nine municipalities, eight rural councils and 47 imadas.

Nine municipalities are in Manouba Governorate:

References

Governorates of Tunisia